Renuka Margrate (born 3 July 1975) is an Indian former cricketer who played as a right-arm medium bowler. She appeared in five Test matches and 23 One Day Internationals for India between 1995 and 2000. She played domestic cricket for Punjab and Railways.

References

External links
 
 

1975 births
Living people
Cricketers from Amritsar
Indian women cricketers
India women Test cricketers
India women One Day International cricketers
Punjab, India women cricketers
Railways women cricketers